Metriotes lutarea is a moth of the family Coleophoridae. It is found in most of Europe (except the Iberian Peninsula and most of the Balkan Peninsula) and Turkey.

Adults are on wing in May and are day-active.

The larvae feed on the seeds of greater stitchwort (Stellaria holostea) and Thesium montanum. At the end of the larval stage it constructs a portable case from a seed capsule and pupation takes place in the bark of a tree.

References

External links
 
 Plant Parasites of Europe

Coleophoridae
Moths described in 1828
Moths of Europe
Moths of Asia
Taxa named by Adrian Hardy Haworth